Diego Cubas (born 14 March 1986) is a Brazilian former professional tennis player.

Born in Joinville, Cubas was a number one junior in Brazil and represented the country in a 2004 Davis Cup tie against Venezuela in Caracas. He was beaten in the first singles rubber by Jimy Szymanski in four sets but won in the reverse singles against Jhonnatan Medina-Álvarez. During his time on the professional tour he won two ITF Futures titles, both in doubles. He also played collegiate tennis in the United States for the University of South Carolina.

ITF Futures titles

Doubles: (2)

See also
List of Brazil Davis Cup team representatives

References

External links
 
 
 

1986 births
Living people
Brazilian male tennis players
South Carolina Gamecocks men's tennis players
Sportspeople from Santa Catarina (state)
People from Joinville
21st-century Brazilian people